The Men competition at the 2017 World Championships was held on 28 and 30 July 2017.

Results
The first two rounds were held on 28 July at 14:30. The last two rounds were held on 30 July at 12:00.

References

Men